= Radwan Samir =

Egyptian professional cyclist

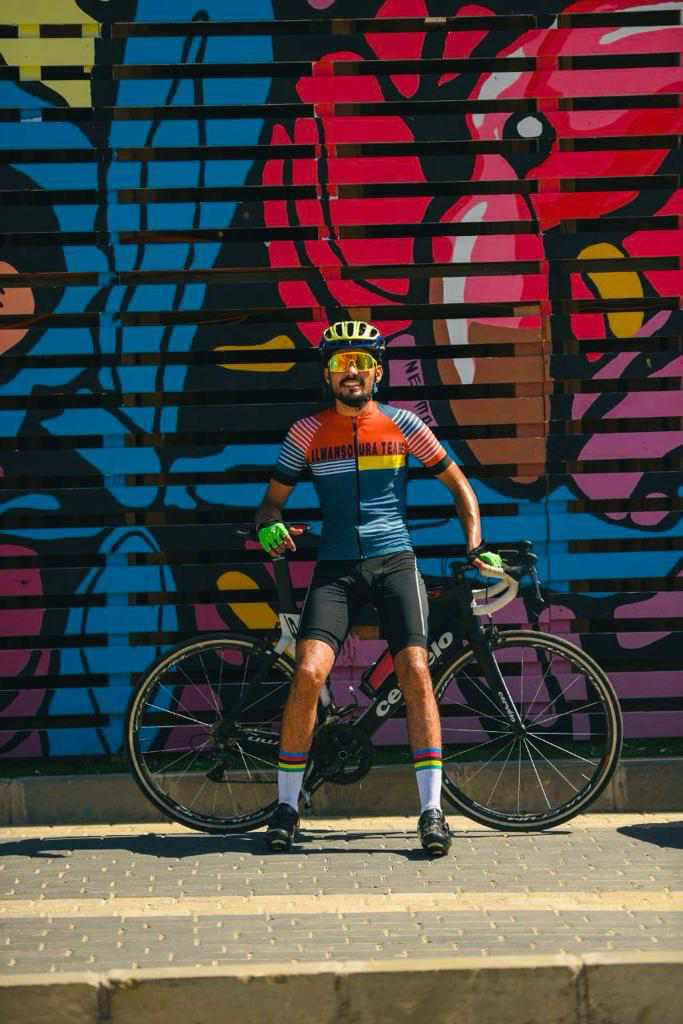
- Radwan Samir in 2023.

Personal information
- Born: 1 June 1999 (age 27)

Sport
- Sport: Cycling
Medal record
Men's Cycling
Representing Egypt
Cycling African Championships
Gold medal – first place	2015 Sharm El Sheikh	PT2 Men
Cycling Arab championships
Silver medal – second place	2014 Sharm El Sheikh	PT2 Men
Bronze medal – third place	2015 Rabat	PT2 Men

Radwan Samir (Arabic: رضوان سمير; born June 1, 1999, Egypt) is an Egyptian professional cyclist. He won the Cycling African Championships in 2015. He has several national and Arab championships to his credit, in the minimal and junior categories.

== Prize list ==
- 2nd place in Cycling Arab Championships and YOG Qualifier (PT2) in Sharm El-Sheikh in 2014.
- 1st place in Cycling African Championships and YOG Qualifier (PT2) in Sharm El-Sheikh in 2015.
- 3rd place in Cycling Arab Championships and YOG Qualifier (PT2) in Rabat, Morocco in 2015.
- 2nd place in the university championship in 2015.
- 3rd place in Marina Delta in 2016.
- 1st place in Cycling Local championship in 2017.
